Valère Joseph Jules Gille (born Anderlecht, 3 May 1867, died Haasdonk, 1 June 1950) was a Belgian poet.

Life
In 1885 Gille enrolled at the Catholic University of Leuven, and in 1887 he began writing for La Jeune Belgique. In 1889 he, together with Iwan Gilkin and Albert Giraud, took over the running of the periodical. He resigned in 1891 to take up a position at the Royal Library of Belgium. A volume of his poems, La Cithare (Paris, 1897) was lauded by the Académie française.

On 8 January 1921 he was appointed to the Académie royale de langue et de littérature françaises de Belgique, becoming its director 1925–1946. In 1945 he became curator of the Wiertz Museum.

He died in Haasdonk on 1 June 1950.

Works

Poetry
 Le Château des merveilles (1893)
 La Cithare (1897) 
 Le Collier d'Opales (1899)
 Les Tombeaux (1900)
 Le Coffret d'ébène (1901)
 La Corbeille d'octobre (1902)
 Le Joli Mai (1905)
 La Victoire ailée (1921)

Drama
 Ce n'était qu'un rêve (1903)
 Madame reçoit (1908)
 Le Sire de Binche (unpublished)

Honours 
 1932 : Commander of the Order of Leopold.

References

Members of the Académie royale de langue et de littérature françaises de Belgique
1867 births
1950 deaths
20th-century Belgian poets
Catholic University of Leuven alumni
Belgian male poets
19th-century Belgian poets
19th-century Belgian male writers
20th-century Belgian male writers